Ontario County may refer to:

Ontario County, New York, United States
Ontario County, Ontario, a former county in Canada
Bradford County, Pennsylvania, United States, known as Ontario County until 1812